Saturday morning preview specials were aired on television annually to present previews of each network's fall lineup of Saturday-morning cartoon children's programming. Like for their new prime time counterpart shows, television networks in the United States and Canada would film a preview special for the fall season. These would often air as part of the regular network schedule, or be made available to their affiliates for airing at any time, especially to fill timeslots which contained programming canceled months before.

Format
The Saturday morning previews were generally aired on the network in prime-time, usually the Friday night before the new schedule began. Specials were staggered between differing time slots and days in order to allow each network's show to stand out.

The preview specials are usually hosted by stars of one or more of the network's popular series and feature an array of special guests, with the continuity between each program preview being fictionalized with a small plot or theme to keep viewers interested. The previews were for new and returning series, with each preview featuring the show's opening credits and a scene from that program. They also unveiled a network's new imaging for Saturday morning programming.

History
Hanna-Barbera Productions created a half-hour syndicated film called "Here Comes a Star" (1964) with Bill Hanna and Joe Barbera playing themselves promoting its newest series, The Magical Gorilla Show. The program, hosted by You Bet Your Life announcer George Fenneman, offered an inside look at the animation studio and a peek at the upcoming feature, Hey There, It's Yogi Bear. The first network preview special was The World of Secret Squirrel and Atom Ant (1965), a 60-minute special airing on NBC in primetime to celebrate Hanna-Barbera's first animated series made for Saturday morning television.

Decline

CBS, which had only irregularly carried preview specials, aired its last in 1985. The other two major networks continued near-annually. NBC's last was in 1991, as by 1992, the network had abandoned cartoons in favor of its teen sitcom block TNBC. ABC continued an annual Saturday preview special as part of its TGIF block through the 1990s, finally ending the practice in 1999, TGIF's last year in its original form.

4Kids Entertainment aired preview specials sporadically for its two blocks, FoxBox and The CW4Kids. Neither Fox Kids nor Kids' WB continued the practice as an annual tradition, though both had aired one-off preview specials in the 1990s.

Because the preview specials incorporated clips from a variety of sources with cross-platform licensing, it was legally impossible to sell them in syndication packages or release them on home video or streaming services.

Year-by-year guide

Syndication

 1964 - Here Comes a Star (hosted by George Fenneman) promoting The Magical Gorilla Show

ABC

 1969 - Super Saturday Cartoon Preview (hosted by the cast of the Ghost and Mrs. Muir and Jonathan Frid from Dark Shadows) 
 1971 - The Brady Bunch Visits ABC (hosted by The Brady Kids from The Brady Bunch)
 1972 - The Brady Bunch Meet ABC's Saturday Superstars (hosted by The Brady Kids from The Brady Bunch)
 1973 - Sneak Peek (hosted by Avery Schreiber and Jack Burns) 
 1974 - Funshine Saturday (hosted by Lee Majors from The Six Million Dollar Man) 
 1975 - Funshine Saturday (hosted by Jim Nabors and Ruth Buzzi from The Lost Saucer)
 1976 - Sneak Peek (hosted by Jimmy Osmond) 
 1977 - All-Star Saturday (hosted by Kaptain Kool and the Kongs)
 1978 - All-Star Saturday (hosted by Jimmy McNichol and Kristy McNichol)
 1979 - Plastic Man and ABC Saturday Morning Sneak Peek (hosted by Michael Young) - Due to a cartoonists' strike delaying show premieres, this special aired over two weeks before the plugged season debuted, and a second preview special, The Plastic Man Preview Hour, aired on Saturday of the following week.
 1982 - Pac Preview Party (hosted by Dick Clark)
 1983 - Preview Special (hosted by Dick Clark)
 1984 - Saturday Morning Preview Park (hosted by "Weird Al" Yankovic)
 1985 - Saturday Sneak Peek & Fun Fit Test (hosted by Tony Danza) 
 1988 - (hosted by cast of Mr. Belvedere)
 1989 - Perfectly Strange Saturday Morning Preview (hosted by cast of Perfect Strangers) 
 1990 - ABC Saturday Morning Preview (hosted by Roseanne Barr and cast of Family Matters) 
 1991 - (hosted by cast of Family Matters) 
 1992 - ABC Sneak Peek with Step by Step (hosted by cast of Step by Step) 
 1993 - ABC Saturday Morning Preview Special (hosted by cast of Hangin' with Mr. Cooper) 
 1994 - Whole New Level of Fun (hosted by cast of Boy Meets World)
 1995 - Saturday Morning Jam Preview Special (hosted by Gary Owens, Marquise Wilson, Raven-Symoné and Zachery Ty Bryan) 
 1996 - Saturday Morning Preview Party (hosted by Melissa Joan Hart) 
 1997 - One Saturday Morning (hosted by Charlie, played by Jessica Prunell) 
 1998 - One Saturday Morning on Friday Night (hosted by Meme, played by Valarie Rae Miller and Salem of Sabrina, the Teenage Witch) 
 1999 - One Saturday Morning on Friday Night (hosted by Meme, played by Valarie Rae Miller)

CBS
1969 - CBS Funtastic Preview (hosted by Sebastian Cabot, Johnny Whitaker and Anissa Jones of Family Affair; featuring Sebastian Cabot, Johnny Whitaker and Anissa Jones of Family Affair)
1974 - Socko Saturday (hosted by cast of The Hudson Brothers; featuring cast of The Hudson Brothers)
1975 - Dyn-o-mite Saturday (hosted by Bern Nadette Stanis, Jimmie Walker and Ralph Carter from Good Times; featuring Bern Nadette Stanis, Jimmie Walker and Ralph Carter from Good Times)
1976 - Hey, Hey, Hey! It's the CBS Saturday Preview Special (hosted by Fat Albert and the Cosby Kids, guest starring Fat Albert and the Cosby Kids 
1977 - The Wacko Saturday Morning Preview and Other Good Stuff Special (hosted by cast of Wacko; featuring cast of Wacko)
1983 - Preview Special (hosted by Scott Baio; featuring the Krofft Puppets, and Scott Baio)
1984 - Saturday's The Place (hosted by Joyce DeWitt; featuring Joyce DeWitt)
1985 - All-Star Rock 'N' Wrestling Saturday Spectacular (hosted by "Rowdy" Roddy Piper, featuring  "Rowdy" Roddy Piper‘s clones)

NBC
1965 - The World of Secret Squirrel and Atom Ant (William Hanna and Joseph Barbera introduce The Atom Ant/Secret Squirrel Show)
1968 - Saturday Morning Preview Special (hosted by The Banana Splits also known as "Tonight's Special Guest Stars," The Amazing Flying Banana Boys
1972 - Howdy Doody and Friends  (featuring the cast of Howdy Doody)
1973 - Starship Rescue (featuring Kevin Tighe and Randolph Mantooth from Emergency!; Billy Barty, Johnny Whitaker and Scott Kolden from Sigmund and the Sea Monsters; and characters from the world of Sid & Marty Krofft)
1974 - Preview Revue (hosted by Jimmy Osmond; featuring Jimmy Osmond)
1975 - Preview Revue (hosted by The Lockers; featuring The Lockers)
1976 - Smilin' Saturday Morning Parade (hosted by Freddie Prinze; featuring Freddie Prinze)
1977 - C'mon Saturday (hosted by Andrea McArdle from Annie; featuring Andrea McArdle from Annie)
1978 - The Bay City Rollers Meet the Saturday Superstars (hosted by Bay City Rollers)
1979 - The Thing Meets Casper and the Shmoo (hosted by Gary Coleman) - Due to a cartoonists' strike delaying many season debuts, this special was cancelled and never aired.
1983 - The 1st Annual NBC Yummy Awards (hosted by Ricky Schroder and Dwight Schultz)
1984 - Laugh Busters (featuring Spider-Man and His Amazing Friends, Kidd Video, Alvin and the Chipmunks, The Snorks, Pink Panther and Sons, Mr. T  The Smurfs) and ( K.I.T.T.) from TV series "Knight Rider"
1985 - Back to Next Saturday (starring Keshia Knight Pulliam and Lisa Whelchel, guest starring Keshia Knight Pulliam and Lisa Whelchel)
1986 - Alvin Goes Back to School
1987 - ALF Loves a Mystery (hosted by Benji Gregory & ALF from ALF; featuring Benji Gregory & ALF from ALF)
1989 - Who Shrunk Saturday Morning? (hosted by cast of Saved by the Bell; featuring cast of Saved by the Bell)
1991 - NBC's World Premiere Cartoon Spectacular

FOX
1991 - Fox Kids Preview (This special wasn't aired on television; instead it was discarded and shelved in order to cut costs.)
1999 - Fox Kids Sneak Preview (hosted by cast of Malcolm in the Middle; featuring cast of Malcolm in the Middle)
2002 - What's Inside the FoxBox? (hosted by cast of Spy Kids; featuring cast of Spy Kids)
2003 - Fight for the FoxBox

The WB
1995 - Welcome Home, Animaniacs! - Kids' WB Preview (hosted by Harland Williams; featuring Harland Williams)
1996 - Kids' WB! Sneak Peek

The CW
2008 - The CW4Kids Brand Spankin' New Spectacular Sneak Peek Party (hosted by Hudson Horstachio from Viva Piñata; featuring Hudson Horstachio from Viva Piñata)
2010 - The CW4Kids Toonzai Friday Fall Preview (hosted by Sonic the Hedgehog from Sonic X; featuring Sonic the Hedgehog from Sonic X)

References

External links
 TV: Preview of Saturday Cartoons (1983) at the New York Times''

American television specials
Children's television series
Children's television in the United States
Morning Preview special
Lists of television series by genre